Cameroon–Russia relations are the bilateral foreign relations between Cameroon and Russia. Russia has an embassy in Yaoundé, and Cameroon has an embassy in Moscow.

Diplomatic relations between the USSR and Cameroon were established on February 20, 1964.

"Joseph Beti Assomo, Cameroon's defence minister, made a discreet but remarkable visit to Moscow to sign a new military cooperation agreement between the two countries. This symbolic trip comes at a time when the Kremlin has relaunched its offensive in Ukraine."  "On 12 April [2022], Cameroon and Russia signed a new military cooperation agreement."

References

 
Africa–Russia relations
Russia
Bilateral relations of Russia